The flag of South Dakota represents the U.S. state of South Dakota. It consists of a field of sky blue charged with a version (in navy blue on white) of the state seal in the center, surrounded by gold triangles representing the sun's rays, surrounded in turn by inscriptions in gold sans-serif capitals of "" on top and "" (the state nickname) on the bottom. The sun represents the common weather in South Dakota. The inscription on the bottom was "" before it was changed in 1992.

Flag pledge
The official pledge of the South Dakota flag is "I pledge loyalty and support to the flag and state of South Dakota, land of sunshine, land of infinite variety." The only protocol to the state flag pledge is that it does not either replace or preempt the Pledge of Allegiance to the flag of the United States.

Original flag

The original flag of South Dakota consisted of a dominant sun encircled by the text "South Dakota" and "The Sunshine State". The 1909 statute stated:

Unsuccessful 2012 flag proposal

In January 2012, Representative Bernie Hunhoff sponsored a bill to adopt a new design for the state flag based on artwork by Dick Termes of Spearfish, South Dakota. Hunhoff introduced the bill on January 25, 2012; it was referred to the State Affairs committee.  On February 6, the bill was amended to create the South Dakota State Flag Commission, which would have solicited submissions from the public for new flag designs and selected one to be considered by the 2013 legislature as the new state flag.  Immediately after being amended, the bill was "deferred to the 41st legislative day". Since the South Dakota legislative session is only 40 days long, this type of deferral effectively kills legislation.

See also

State of South Dakota
Symbols of the State of South Dakota
Great Seal of the State of South Dakota

References

External links
Signs and Symbols of South Dakota

Flags of South Dakota
Flag
Flags displaying animals